The following lists the top 25 singles of 2010  in Australia from the Australian Recording Industry Association (ARIA) End of Year singles chart.

"Love The Way You Lie" by Eminem featuring Rihanna was the biggest song of the year, peaking at #1 for 6 weeks and staying in the Top 50 (so far) for 30 weeks. The longest stay at number one was also "Love The Way You Lie" by Eminem featuring Rihanna, as well as "OMG" by Usher and will.i.am, which both stayed at number one for 6 weeks.

Notes

References

Australian record charts
2010 in Australian music
Australia Top 25 Singles